Sissel Benneche Osvold (born 4 April 1945) is a Norwegian journalist.

She was born in Stavanger, a daughter of Gerd Benneche, and is married to Totto Osvold. She worked for the newspaper Dagbladet from 1973 to 2007, where she had her own column, Sidesprang, from 1990. She was awarded Den Store Journalistprisen by the Norwegian Press Association in 1992. In 2007 she received the Fritt Ord Honorary Award.

References

1945 births
Living people
Writers from Stavanger
Norwegian journalists
Norwegian women journalists
Dagbladet people
Norwegian columnists
Norwegian women columnists